The Australian Cinematographers Society (ACS) is a not-for-profit organisation founded in 1958 for the purpose of providing a forum for Australian cinematographers to further develop their skills through mutual co-operation.

Location 
Its National Headquarters and clubhouse is located in North Sydney.

Mission 
The ACS states the following aims:
To keep members informed about the latest technology with new equipment demonstrations and ideas through meetings and seminars.
To further the advancement of Cinematography in all fields and give due recognition to the outstanding work performed by Australian Cinematographers.
To provide a forum for Cinematographers to meet with other members of the industry to discuss and exchange ideas, promote friendship and better understanding of each other's industry role.

People 
Its first National President was Syd Wood ACS. The National President is Erika Addis, the first female to hold the office.

The ACS presents annual awards for achievements in cinematography, including the Golden Tripod (the ACS's highest award for excellence), and the Milli Award to its Cinematographer of the Year. Members of the Society who are "accredited" are allowed to use the ACS suffix after their name. Accreditation is considered one of the highest honours bestowed upon a member and accreditation demonstrates more than just professional competence, but also creativity, consistency and aesthetic innovation.

Awards 
The Australian Academy of Cinema and Television Arts (AACTA) awarded the Australian Cinematographers Society (ACS) as the recipient of the 2014 Byron Kennedy Award at the 3rd annual AACTA Awards. The award celebrates outstanding creative enterprise within the film and television industries and is given to an individual or organisation whose work embodies innovation and the relentless pursuit of excellence. The award jury said of their decision: "We have chosen the Australian Cinematographers Society under the stewardship of Ron Johanson ACS for its enduring and pivotal role in the pursuit of excellence throughout Australian cinema". The award was presented to Ron Johanson ACS on behalf of the Society at the AACTA Awards Ceremony in Sydney on Thursday, 30 January 2014.

The Milli Award is the highest award an Australian Cinematographer can receive from the Society. It is presented at the ACS National Awards for Cinematography to the Australian Cinematographer of the Year. All ACS National Gold Tripod winners progress through to be in the running for the Milli Award.

Legacy
At least six members of the society have been awarded with the Academy Award for Best Cinematography.
Dean Semler AM ACS ASC for Dances With Wolves (1990).
John Seale AM ACS ASC for The English Patient (1996).
Andrew Lesnie ACS ASC for The Lord of the Rings: The Fellowship of the Ring (2001).
Russell Boyd ACS ASC for Master and Commander: The Far Side of the World (2003).
Dion Beebe ACS ASC for Memoirs of a Geisha (2005).
Greig Fraser ACS ASC for Dune (2021).

Books and publications
 AC Magazine is the quarterly journal of the Australian Cinematographers Society.
 The Shadowcatchers: A history of Cinematography in Australia (2012)

References

External links

The Shadowcatchers website
Showreelfinder. Online showcase of Australian Cinematographer Society National Award Winners. Published annually.

Cinematography organizations
Entertainment industry societies
Organizations established in 1958
Film organisations in Australia
1958 establishments in Australia